The French Boxing Federation  or FFB) is the governing body of both amateur and professional boxing in France.

Presidents 

Emile Grémaux was the President of FFB for a long time.

Martin André is the current President.

References

External links
  

France
Boxing in France
Boxing
Amateur boxing organizations